Falko Mohrs (born 23 July 1984) is a German politician of the Social Democratic Party (SPD) who has been serving as State Minister for Science and Culture in the government of Lower Saxony since 2022. He previously was a member of the Bundestag from the state of Lower Saxony from 2017 to 2022.

Political career

Member of the German Parliament, 2017–2022
Mohrs became a member of the Bundestag in the 2017 German federal election. He was a member of the Committee on Economic Affairs and Energy and the Committee on the Digital Agenda. In this capacity, he served as his parliamentary group’s rapporteur on the digital economy and 5G.

In addition to his committee assignments, Mohrs was part of the German Parliamentary Friendship Group for Relations with the Central African States.

In the negotiations to form a so-called traffic light coalition of the SPD, the Green Party and the Free Democrats (FDP) following the 2021 German elections, Mohrs was part of his party's delegation in the working group on digital innovation and infrastructure, co-chaired by Jens Zimmermann, Malte Spitz and Andreas Pinkwart.

Career in state government
In the negotiations to form a third cabinet under Minister-President of Lower Saxony Stephan Weil following the 2022 state elections, Mohrs was part of the leadership team of his party's delegation. He was later appointed State Minister for Science and Culture in the new state government.

Other activities
 Braunschweigische Stiftung, Member of the Board of Trustees (since 2022)
 Stiftung Lesen, Member of the Board of Trustees (since 2022)
 Business Forum of the Social Democratic Party of Germany, Member of the Political Advisory Board (since 2020)
 Federal Network Agency for Electricity, Gas, Telecommunications, Post and Railway (BNetzA), Alternate Member of the Advisory Board
 IG Metall, Member
 Reservist Association of Deutsche Bundeswehr, Member
 Association of Christian Guides and Scouts (VCP), Member

References

External links 

  
 Bundestag biography 

1984 births
Living people
Members of the Bundestag for Lower Saxony
Members of the Bundestag 2021–2025
Members of the Bundestag 2017–2021
Members of the Bundestag for the Social Democratic Party of Germany